The 2011–12 Syracuse Orange men's basketball team represented Syracuse University in the 2011–12 NCAA Division I men's basketball season. The head coach, Jim Boeheim, served for his 36th year. The team played its home games at the Carrier Dome in Syracuse, New York and is a member of the Big East Conference.

In 2015, Syracuse voluntarily vacated 9 wins from this season due to participation of ineligible players. Following an NCAA investigation, all 25 other wins were vacated.

Preseason

Roster changes
Syracuse graduated one starter from the previous year's team, power forward Rick Jackson. Center DaShonte Riley transferred to Eastern Michigan.

Recruiting

Preseason outlook
In the Big East preseason Coaches' Poll, Syracuse was predicted to finish tied for first with Connecticut. The Orange received five first place votes and 209 votes overall. Kris Joseph was named to the Preseason All-Big East first team and Scoop Jardine was named to the second team.

Postseason awards
Fab Melo was named the Big East's Defensive Player of the Year and Dion Waiters won the Big East Sixth Man Award.
Kris Joseph was named to the All-Big East First Team while Scoop Jardine made the Second Team and Dion Waiters made the Third Team.

The National Association of Basketball Coaches named Joseph to its All-America Second Team.

NBC Sports also named Melo the Big East's Defensive Player of the Year and Waiters the Sixth Man of the Year.  NBC named Joseph to its All-Big East First Team and Jardine and Waiters to its Second Team.

CBS Sports named Waiters its national Sixth Man of the Year.  It also named Waiters All-Big East First Team and Joseph Second Team.

Roster

Depth chart

Schedule

|-
!colspan=12 style="background:#FF6F00; color:#212B6D;"| Exhibition

|-
!colspan=12 style="background:#FF6F00; color:#212B6D;"| Regular Season

|-
!colspan=12 style="background:#FF6F00; color:#212B6D;" | Big East Regular Season

|-
!colspan=12 style="background:#FF6F00; color:#212B6D;" | 2012 Big East men's basketball tournament 

|-
!colspan=12 style="background:#FF6F00; color:#212B6D;" | 2012 NCAA Division I men's basketball tournament

Rankings

2012–13 Recruiting

References

External links

Syracuse Orange
Syracuse Orange men's basketball seasons
Syracuse Orange